Trịnh Xuân Thuận (born August 20, 1948) is a Vietnamese-American astrophysicist.

Biography
Trịnh Xuân Thuận was born in Hanoi, Vietnam. He completed his B.S. at the California Institute of Technology, and his Ph.D. at Princeton University. He has taught astronomy at the University of Virginia, where he is a professor, since 1976, and is also a research associate at the Institut d’Astrophysique de Paris. He was a founding member of the International Society for Science and Religion.

Thuận was the recipient of UNESCO's Kalinga Prize in 2009 for his work in popularizing science.
He received the Kalinga chair award at the 99th Indian Science Congress at Bhubaneswar.
In 2012, he was awarded the Prix mondial Cino Del Duca from the Institut de France. This prize recognizes authors whose work, literary or scientific, constitutes a message of modern humanism.
Thuận's areas of interest are extragalactic astronomy and galaxy formation. His research has focused on the evolution of galaxies and the chemical composition of the universe, and on compact blue dwarf galaxies.

Books for general readers
 1992. Le destin de l'univers : Le big bang, et après, collection « Découvertes Gallimard » (nº 151), série Sciences et techniques. Paris: Éditions Gallimard.
 1993. UK edition – The Changing Universe: Big Bang and After, 'New Horizons' series. London: Thames & Hudson.
 1993. US edition – The Birth of the Universe: The Big Bang and After, "Abrams Discoveries" series. New York: Harry N. Abrams.
 1994. The Secret Melody.
 2000. Chaos and Harmony.
 2001. The Quantum and the Lotus. (with Matthieu Ricard)
 2008. Voyage au cœur de la lumière, collection « Découvertes Gallimard » (nº 527), série Sciences et techniques. Paris: Éditions Gallimard.

References

Trinh Xuan Thuan and Axel Reisinger, (2000). Chaos and Harmony: Perspectives on Scientific Revolutions of the 20th Century, Oxford University Press.

External links
Trinhxuanthuan.fr
website Trịnh Xuân Thuận 
Interview about science and Buddhism 
Ba cái chết cho ngôi sao - Trois morts pour l'étoile, 
Détermination de la distance d'une étoile céphéide

1948 births
Living people
People from Hanoi
Asian writers in French
Vietnamese emigrants to the United States
20th-century American astronomers
Writers of Vietnamese descent
American cosmologists
Members of the International Society for Science and Religion
Kalinga Prize recipients
American male writers
20th-century American physicists
American writers in French
20th-century American writers
21st-century American writers